Lightning Bug is a 2004 coming of age drama film. It is the debut film by writer/director and SFX makeup artist Robert Green Hall. The film a fictionalized account of Hall's own childhood and entry into special effects makeup for film and television. It was filmed on location Fairview, Alabama. The film was executive produced by Laura Prepon.

Plot

Single mother Jenny Graves decides to restart her dead end life by moving out of Detroit and taking her two sons Green and Jay to small rural town in Alabama. Green is fan of horror films, more specifically the makeup effects used to bring them to life. He meets a pair of affable locals, Tony Bennet and Billy Martin.

However, his mother's penchant for getting involved with the wrong type of men brings a very human monster into his life, Earl Knight.

Taking some horror films back to the video store, he meets Angevin Duvet who shares both his interest in the horror genre and fish-out-of-water status in the small town. Smart, funny and a sexy Goth girl he is instantly smitten. However, there are hints that there are some troubling aspects to her past.

Green approaches the local business man, Tightwiler, who runs a yearly haunted house and by startling him with one of his creations nabs the job of creating this year's haunted house. With his share of the ticket sales, he and Angevin can move to Hollywood to pursue their dreams. However, this puts him on a direct collision course with Angenvin's mother, a deeply religious woman involved with local Holy Calling of the Southern Saints church.

Cast
Ashley Laurence - Jenny Graves
Bret Harrison - Green Graves
Laura Prepon - Angevin Duvet
Kevin Gage - Earl Knight
Lucas Till - Jay Graves
Jonathan Spencer - Tony Bennet
George Faughnan - Billy Martin
Jamie Avera - Deputy Hollis
Bob Penny - Tightwiler

External links
 
 

2004 films
American horror films
2004 drama films
2004 horror films
2004 directorial debut films
2000s English-language films
2000s American films